"Stay A Little While, Child" is the tenth single by English R&B band Loose Ends from their third studio album, Zagora, and was released in June 1986 by Virgin Records. The song reached number 52 in the UK Charts.

Track listing
7” Single: VS819
 "Stay A Little While, Child" 4.09
 "Gonna Make You Mine" 4.29  **

12” Single: VS819-12
 "Stay A Little While, Child (Extended Version)"  8.11  *
 "Gonna Make You Mine" 4.29  **
 "Stay A Little While, Child (Dub Version)" 7.56  **

2nd 12” Single: VS819-13
 "Stay A Little While, Child (Extended Version)"  8.11  *
 "Gonna Make You Mine"  **
 "Tell Me What You Want (U.S. Remix)" - Edited version of the mix featured on the U.S. version of the CD album 'A Little Spice3rd 12” Single: VS819-14
 "Stay A Little While, Child (Extended Version)"  8.11  *
 "Gonna Make You Mine (Westside Remix)" 5.43  +
 "Gonna Make You Mine (Bonus Beats)"U.S. only release - 12" Single MCA-23635
 "Stay A Little While, Child (Extended Version)" 8.11  *
 "Stay A Little While, Child (Radio Edit)" 5:55
 "Stay A Little While, Child (Dub Version)" 7:56  **
 "Stay A Little While, Child (Instrumental)" 5:55
 "Stay A Little While, Child (Bonus Beats)" 5:42* The Extended Version of 'Stay A Little While, Child' was released on the U.S. version of the CD album 'Zagora' instead of the Album Version.** 'Gonna Make You Mine' and Stay A Little While, Child (Dub Version) were released as extra tracks on the CD album 'Zagora'+' 'Gonna Make You Mine (Westside Remix)' was released on CD in 1992 on the 'Tighten Up Volume 1' remix project. It was remixed by Dancin' Danny D & Godwin Logie.

Chart performance

References

External links
 Stay a Little While, Child (1986) at Discogs.

1986 songs
1986 singles
Loose Ends (band) songs
Song recordings produced by Nick Martinelli
Songs written by Carl McIntosh (musician)
Songs written by Jane Eugene
Songs written by Steve Nichol